Igor Anić (born 12 June 1987) is a French handball player who plays for Cesson Rennes MHB

References

1987 births
Living people
Bosnia and Herzegovina emigrants to France
Bosnia and Herzegovina male handball players
Croats of Bosnia and Herzegovina
French male handball players
French people of Bosnia and Herzegovina descent
Sportspeople from Mostar
Competitors at the 2009 Mediterranean Games
Mediterranean Games silver medalists for France
Mediterranean Games medalists in handball